The 2015 season is the 118th season of competitive football in Sweden. The competitive started with the group stage of Svenska Cupen on 21 February. League competition started in early April with Allsvenskan on 5 April, Superettan on 5 April and Division 1 on 12 April. Svenska Cupen concluded with the final on 17 May. Allsvenskan will conclude on 31 October, Superettan and Division 1 on 1 November and lower men's leagues on the weekend before. Qualification play-offs were held after the end of league play with the Allsvenskan and Superettan play-offs being held on 4/5 and 7/8 November. Svenska Supercupen was held on 8 November and will be contested by the winner of Allsvenskan and Svenska Cupen. Sweden participated in qualifying for the UEFA Euro 2016.

Honours

Men's football

Official titles

Competitions

Women's football

Official titles

Competitions

Promotions, relegations and qualifications

Men's football

International qualifications

Domestic results

Men's football

2015 Allsvenskan

2016 Allsvenskan playoffs

2015 Superettan

2016 Superettan play-offs

2015 Division 1 Norra

2015 Division 1 Södra

2014–15 Svenska Cupen

2015 Svenska Supercupen

Women's football

2015 Damallsvenskan

2015 Elitettan

National teams

Sweden national football team

UEFA Euro 2016 qualifying

UEFA Euro 2016 qualifying play-offs

Friendlies

Notes

Sweden national under-21 football team

2015 UEFA European Under-21 Championship

Group stage

Knockout stage

Sweden women's national football team

2015 FIFA Women's World Cup

Group stage

Knockout stage

UEFA Women's Euro 2017 qualifying

2015 Algarve Cup 

Group A

Ranking of first-placed teams

Friendlies

Swedish clubs' performance in Europe
These are the results of the Swedish teams in European competitions during the 2015–16 season. (Swedish team score displayed first)

Men's football

Women's football

References

 
Seasons in Swedish football